Christening cap was a headgear of 18th-and early 19th-century. The smallest cap in the collections of Den Gamle By is made of striped silk with linen in tabby weave. It has the measurements approximately a size of  woman's fist, from forehead to the back of the neck it measures around 15.5 cm.

See also 

 Baptism
List of headgear

References 

18th-century fashion
19th-century fashion
Baptism
Headgear